Jason Line (born July 24, 1969 in Wright, Minnesota) drives the KB Racing Summit Racing Chevrolet Camaro Pro Stock car in the NHRA Mello Yello Drag Racing Series. Line resides in Terrell, North Carolina with his wife, Cindy, son, Jack and daughter, Emma.

Living just a few miles away from the Brainerd International Raceway in Brainerd, Mn, Jason became an avid drag racing fan as a kid while learning engine repair and performance tricks from his dad who was considered an "ACE Mechanic" and Muscle Car enthusiast in the area. Jason acquired a 1970 Buick GS as a teenager and went to work on perfecting it in its stock form, took it to the track, and quickly began cutting impressive reaction times and consistent wins. In a short time he won the locally coveted 1993 NHRA Region 5 championship and went on to win the NHRA National Stock Championship that same year.

Awards
51 career NHRA wins (49 in Pro Stock as well as 2 in the Sportsman Classes)
Has a career best E.T. of 6.455 seconds, and a career best speed of 215.17 miles per hour (346.28 km/h)
With the Jesel Land Speed/Summit Racing Team, Jason Broke the A/Modified Production Speed Record of 191 mph with an impressive 225.246 mph at Bonneville Flats in 2012
Won 2006, 2011 & 2016 NHRA Pro Stock Championships.
2004 NHRA Rookie of The Year.
Finished second to teammate Greg Anderson in the 2004 NHRA championship.
Won 1993 NHRA Stock Eliminator Championship.

Stats are current as of November 12, 2019

http://nhra.com/drivers/pro-stock/Jason-Line/

Trivia
Served in the United States Air Force from 1987–1991.
Began working for Joe Gibbs' NASCAR team in 1998, where he served as Chief Dynamometer Engine Specialist.
Competed in first NHRA race in 1985 driving a 1968 Chevelle at Brainerd International Raceway.

https://web.archive.org/web/20150904032000/http://www.nhra.com/points/national-records.aspx

References
Line's profile from KB Racing
Line's profile from Summit Racing
Line's profile from NHRA

Living people
1969 births
People from Carlton County, Minnesota
Racing drivers from Minnesota
Dragster drivers